Luca Paolini (born 17 January 1977) is an Italian former road bicycle racer, who rode professionally between 2000 and 2015. He started his sports career in the early 2000s by joining  (2000–2002), UCI ProTeam directed by Patrick Lefevere. Within Mapei-Quick Step and then its successor team  (2003–2005), Luca Paolini achieved several victories. Among them were first places at Gran Premio di Lugano, Giro del Piemonte and Gran Premio Bruno Beghelli. He has also won stages at Tour of Britain and Tour de Wallonie.

Career

Paolini was born in Milan. Seasons 2006–2007 and 2008–2010 Luca Paolini spent in two Italian cycling team –  and  respectively. As their member, he triumphed at certain stages of Vuelta a España and Three Days of De Panne, won one-day races Gran Premio Città di Camaiore, Trofeo Laigueglia, Coppa Placci as well as Coppa Bernocchi. Meanwhile, his bright victories attracted a particular attention from anti-doping bodies. As his name appeared in taped phone conversations together with Ivan Basso and his sister Elisa, he was suspected in illegal drugs usage. In September 2006 Paolini's home was searched in a doping investigation which was called Operazione Athena – however it appears that no evidence was found that led to any conviction of Paolini's fault, so Team Liquigas refused to suspend him.

In 2011, he was signed by Russian  to be a domestique for Filippo Pozzato both at classics and Grand Tours. However, due to Pozzato's poor performance and traumas in season 2011, he switched to other co-riders and pursued his personal goals in the peloton. In autumn 2011 he finished third at Giro del Piemonte having taken his first podium for Team Katusha. In 2013, Paolini took the Omloop Het Nieuwsblad after breaking away from the leading group with 's Stijn Vandenbergh. The pair resisted and Paolini won the sprint after Vandenburgh took long pulls in the final kilometers. In Milan – San Remo, Paolini finished in the lead group in fifth position, as 's Gerald Ciolek won the race.

In 2015, Paolini won a very windy and difficult edition of Gent–Wevelgem, as only 39 riders out of 160 finished the race. Paolini attacked his breakaway companions with five kilometers to go and benefited from a disorganized chase to win solo. In May, it was announced that Paolini's contract with Katusha had been extended by a year, finishing at the end of 2016.

Doping case
In the 2015 Tour de France, Paolini tested positive for cocaine and was thrown out of the race after Stage 7. His contract with Katusha was nullified. He revealed that he had been suffering from an addiction to the sleeping drug benzodiazepine and claimed to have taken cocaine "at a low point in his life".

In April 2016, he was banned from competition for 18 months, with the UCI judging that he had not intended to breach the anti-doping rules, as they do not prohibit the use of cocaine outside competition. Katusha confirmed that he would not be able to return to the team.

Paolini's ban expired in January 2017, however in an interview that month he said that he had retired from racing after being unable to find a team, and had invested in a coffee bar in Como. He also stated that he had overcome his addiction to benzodiazepine.

Major results

1999
 1st Trofeo Città di Brescia
 1st Gran Premio di Poggiana
 2nd  Road race, UCI Under-23 Road World Championships
 2nd Giro del Mendrisiotto
2000
 Tour de l'Avenir
1st  Points classification
1st Stage 1
 1st Stage 3 Tour de Normandie
 1st  Mountains classification, Danmark Rundt
 5th Gran Premio della Costa Etruschi
2001
 1st Gran Premio di Lugano
 4th Giro del Piemonte
 5th Coppa Bernocchi
2002
 1st Giro del Piemonte
 2nd Overall Tour de la Région Wallonne
 4th Japan Cup
 8th Coppa Bernocchi
 8th Coppa Placci
 9th Criterium d'Abruzzo
 9th Tre Valli Varesine
 10th Gran Premio di Chiasso
 10th Gran Premio Bruno Beghelli
2003
 1st Gran Premio Bruno Beghelli
 2nd Coppa Sabatini
 3rd Milan–San Remo
 3rd Brabantse Pijl
 6th Overall Vuelta a Andalucía
 7th Paris–Brussels
 8th Road race, UCI Road World Championships
 8th Paris–Tours
 9th Overall Tirreno–Adriatico
2004
 1st Brabantse Pijl
 3rd  Road race, UCI Road World Championships
 3rd Gran Premio Città di Camaiore
 5th Trofeo Laigueglia
2005
 Tour of Britain
1st  Points classification
1st Stages 3 & 6
 1st Stage 3 Tour de la Région Wallonne
 2nd HEW Cyclassics
 8th GP Ouest–France
2006
 1st Gran Premio Città di Camaiore
 1st Stage 12 Vuelta a España
 3rd Coppa Bernocchi
 3rd Milan–San Remo
 4th Trofeo Matteotti
 Vuelta a Mallorca
6th Trofeo Cala Millor
10th Trofeo Mallorca
 7th E3 Prijs Vlaanderen
2007
 3rd Giro della Romagna
 3rd Tour of Flanders
 4th Coppa Bernocchi
 10th Overall Three Days of De Panne
1st Stage 1
2008
 1st Trofeo Laigueglia
 1st Coppa Placci
 2nd Giro del Piemonte
 3rd Paris–Brussels
 4th Giro della Romagna
 5th Gran Premio Industria e Commercio Artigianato Carnaghese
 6th Gent–Wevelgem
 7th Overall Giro della Provincia di Grosseto
 7th GP Industria & Artigianato di Larciano
 10th Overall Three Days of De Panne
2009
 1st Coppa Bernocchi
 1st Stage 6 Settimana Ciclistica Lombarda
 2nd Memorial Cimurri
 3rd Road race, National Road Championships
 3rd Gran Premio Industria e Commercio di Prato
 3rd Giro del Veneto
 4th Gran Premio Bruno Beghelli
 4th Giro del Piemonte
 4th Giro di Lombardia
 6th Gran Premio della Costa Etruschi
 9th Milan–San Remo
2010
 3rd Overall Three Days of De Panne
1st  Points classification
 3rd Coppa Ugo Agostoni
 4th Omloop Het Nieuwsblad
 4th Giro del Veneto
 6th Trofeo Laigueglia
 6th Giro del Friuli
 6th Dwars door Vlaanderen
 6th Gran Premio Industria e Commercio di Prato
 10th Milan–San Remo
 10th Gent–Wevelgem
 10th Grand Prix de Wallonie
2011
 2nd Gran Premio Industria e Commercio di Prato
 3rd Giro del Piemonte
 4th Coppa Ugo Agostoni
 5th Omloop Het Nieuwsblad
 10th Gran Premio Bruno Beghelli
2012
 2nd Gran Premio Industria e Commercio di Prato
 2nd Gran Piemonte
 4th Grand Prix Cycliste de Québec
 4th Grand Prix de Wallonie
 7th Tour of Flanders
 9th Road race, Olympic Games
 9th Grand Prix Cycliste de Montréal
 10th GP Ouest–France
2013
 1st Omloop Het Nieuwsblad
 Giro d'Italia
1st Stage 3
Held  after Stage 3–6
 5th Milan–San Remo
 8th E3 Harelbeke
2015
 1st Gent–Wevelgem

Grand Tour general classification results timeline

Classics results timeline

Major championship results timeline

See also
List of doping cases in cycling

References

External links

Palmares at Cycling Base

1977 births
Living people
Doping cases in cycling
Cyclists from Milan
Italian male cyclists
Italian sportspeople in doping cases
Italian Vuelta a España stage winners
Cyclists at the 2004 Summer Olympics
Cyclists at the 2012 Summer Olympics
Olympic cyclists of Italy
Italian Giro d'Italia stage winners